Bradwell Moor is a moorland hill above the village of Bradwell, Derbyshire in the Peak District.

Batham Gate Roman road ran across the moor, from nearby Navio Roman fort (at Brough-on-Noe) to Aquae Arnemetiae (Buxton). Batham Gate is Old English for "road to the bath town". Clement Lane follows the original route across the moor. The section of Batham Gate road east of Peak Forest is a protected Scheduled Monument.

There are numerous historic lead mines around the moor which are protected Scheduled Monuments. Lead mining in the area dates back to the Bronze Age, with larger scale production in Roman times. Cop Rake and Moss Rake lead mines (include the sites of Starvehouse Mine, New York Mine and Cop Mine) have been extracting lead-bearing ore from veins near the surface since at least the 13th century (when it was recorded as Wardlow Cop).

Hope Quarry is a large limestone quarry that covers the north-east side of the moor between Castleton and Bradwell. The quarry is now operated by Breedon. In 1990 a Mesolithic stone working site was discovered by The Trent & Peak Archaeological Trust where Bradwell Moor Barn once stood, before the land was excavated by the quarry operator at the time (Blue Circle).

The highest point of the Limestone Way long-distance footpath is at  where it crosses Bradwell Moor, slightly west of its summit.

References 

Mountains and hills of the Peak District
Mountains and hills of Derbyshire
Moorlands of England